This is list of canals in Estonia. The list is incomplete.

References 

Canals
 
Estonia
 
Canals